Frenchman Lake is a lake located in Carmacks, Yukon, Canada.

References 

Lakes of Yukon